André Charles Ulrich Parrot (15 February 1901 – 24 August 1980) was a French archaeologist specializing in the ancient Near East. He led excavations in Lebanon, Iraq and Syria, and is best known for his work at Mari, Syria, where he led important excavations from 1933 to 1975.

Biography 
Parrot was born in 1901 in Désandans in the French department of Doubs. He was appointed chief curator of the National Museums in 1946, and became director of the Louvre from 1958 to 1962. He was a Commander of the Legion of Honour and a member of the Académie des Inscriptions et Belles-Lettres. He married his second wife Marie-Louise Girod in 1960, and died in Paris in 1980.

One of his students at the École du Louvre was Denise Cocquerillat. When he was mobilised in 1940, he was replaced as a teacher at the École du Louvre by Marguerite Rutten.

Bibliography 
 Mari, a lost city (1936)
 Mesopotamian Archaeology (1946–1953)
 The Temple of Jerusalem (1957)
 Sumer (1960)
 Assur (1961)
 Abraham and His Times (1962, Oxford UP)
 The Treasure of Ur (1968)
 The Art of Sumer (1970)
 The excavations of Mari, 18th and 19th campaigns (1970–1971)
 Mari, fabulous capital (1974)
 Les Phéniciens: L'expansion phénicienne; Carthage (Paris: Gallimard, 1975)
 Archaeology (1976)
 Archaeological Adventure (1979)

References

External links 
 André Parrot on data.bnf.fr

1901 births
1980 deaths
French archaeologists
French Assyriologists
People from Doubs
Directors of the Louvre
Members of the Académie des Inscriptions et Belles-Lettres
French art historians
Commandeurs of the Légion d'honneur
20th-century archaeologists
Corresponding Fellows of the British Academy